Paul A. Ramdohr (1 January 1890 in Überlingen – 8 March 1985 in Hohensachsen/Weinheim), was a German mineralogist, ore deposit-researcher and a pioneer of ore microscopy.

Life 
After attending school at the "Alten Gymnasium" of Darmstadt and studying at the University of Heidelberg, he earned his Doctorate in 1919 under the direction of Otto Mügge in Göttingen with a Dissertation on Basalts of the Blauen Kuppe near Eschwege. As a student in Heidelberg, Ramdohr joined the fraternity Leonensia. His Habilitation was completed soon thereafter under the direction of W. Bruhns on the topic of the Gabbros in the area of  Böllstein/Brombachtal.
In 1926, he took a position at the University of Aachen as Professor of Mineralogy, Petrography and Ore Geology. In 1934 he moved to the Humboldt University of Berlin, and in 1951 to the University of Heidelberg. There he occupied the Professorship of Mineralogy, which he held until 1958.

Paul Ramdohr was married and had four sons and one daughter.

Publications 
 1926: Kristallographie, Göschen-Band together with Willy Bruhns 
 1931–1934: Lehrbuch der Erzmikroskopie Vols. 1 und 2, with Hans Schneiderhöhn
 1936: Lehrbuch der Mineralogie together with Friedrich Klockmann
 1924: Beobachtungen an opaken Erzen
 1928: Über den Mineralbestand und die Strukturen der Erze des Rammelbergs
 1948: Lehrbuch der Mineralogie 13. Edition, with Klockmann
 1950: Die Erzmineralien und ihre Verwachsungen
 1954: Lehrbuch der Mineralogie 14. Edition, with Klockmann
 1955: Petrografie Göschen-Band 4. Edition
 1955: The ore minerals and their intergrowth edited by ILMEN, 2014
 1965: Kristallographie Göschen-Band
 1973: The opaque minerals in stony meteorites
 1975: Die Erzmineralien und ihre Verwachsungen 4. Auflage
 1978: Lehrbuch der Mineralogie 16. Auflage together with Klockmann and Karl Hugo Strunz
 1980: The ore minerals and their intergrowth 2nd Edition

Honorary Doctorates 
 1955: Dr.-Ing. E.h. (TU Berlin)
 1960: Dr. rer. Nat. h.c. (RWTH Aachen)
 1968: Ph. D. Es. Sci. (Universität Nancy)
 1969: Dr. rer. Nat. h.c. (TU Clausthal)
 1973: Dr.-Ing. de Minas, h.c. (Madrid)

Prizes and Honors 
 1937: Membership in the Prussian Academy of Science
 1936–1947: President of the German Mineralogical Society
 1951: Membership in the Heidelberg Academy of Science
 1962: Roebling Medal of the Mineralogical Society of America
 1965–1985: Honorary President of the SGA 
 1970: Georg-Agricola-Medal
 1978: Penrose Gold Medal
 1979: Leonard Medal

Sources

External links
 Museum HU Berlin - Bild von Paul Ramdohr
 RWTH-Aachen - Paul-Ramdohr-Stiftung
 Universitäts- und Landesbibliothek Darmstadt - Bücher von und mit Paul Ramdohr
Memorial of Paul Ramdohr von Werner Schreyer (engl. PDF-Datei) (296 KB)

1890 births
1985 deaths
German mineralogists
Members of the Prussian Academy of Sciences
People from the Grand Duchy of Baden
Heidelberg University alumni
Academic staff of Heidelberg University
University of Göttingen alumni
Academic staff of RWTH Aachen University
Academic staff of the Humboldt University of Berlin
Scientists active at the Museum für Naturkunde, Berlin
Knights Commander of the Order of Merit of the Federal Republic of Germany